Wickersheim-Wilshausen is a commune in the Bas-Rhin department in Grand Est in north-eastern France. The commune was formed in 1973 by the merger of the former communes Wickersheim and Wilshausen.

Population

See also
 Communes of the Bas-Rhin department

References

Communes of Bas-Rhin